Corbellini is a name of Italian origin which may refer to:

People
 Antonio Corbellini, Italian architect
 Carlo Corbellini, 18th-century Italian architect
 Domenico Corbellini, Italian architect
 Gilberto Corbellini (born 1958), Italian philosopher
 Giorgio Corbellini (1947–2019), Italian bishop
 Guido Corbellini (1890–1976), Italian engineer and politician
 Isabella Corbellini (born 1972), Italian athlete
 Luigi Corbellini (1901–1968), Italian painter
 Vanni Corbellini (born 1955), Italian actor
 Vital Corbellini (born 1959), Brazilian bishop